Kilco Marak (born 27 July 1992) is an Indian cricketer. He made his Twenty20 debut on 9 November 2019, for Meghalaya in the 2019–20 Syed Mushtaq Ali Trophy. He made his first-class debut on 24 February 2022, for Meghalaya in the 2021–22 Ranji Trophy.

References

External links
 

1992 births
Living people
Indian cricketers
Meghalaya cricketers
Place of birth missing (living people)